Jonathan Randall Horst (born April 16, 1983) is an American basketball general manager for the Milwaukee Bucks of the National Basketball Association (NBA), appointed on June 16, 2017, and named NBA Executive of the Year on June 24, 2019.

While a player on the Rochester University basketball team, Horst won back-to-back United States Collegiate Athletic Association national championships in 2004 and 2005.

Executive career
Horst held the position of Director of Basketball Operations for the Milwaukee Bucks from April 2008 to June 2017, and from August 2007 to April 2008 he was the Manager of Basketball Operations for the Detroit Pistons. 

Horst became the general manager of the Milwaukee Bucks in June 2017. He took over from John Hammond, who joined the Orlando Magic. After the 2018–19 NBA season, Horst won the 2019 NBA Executive of the Year award. The Bucks had a league-best 60–22 record and reached the Eastern Conference finals in the 2019 NBA playoffs. On June 7, 2019, Horst signed a contract extension with the Milwaukee Bucks. On July 20, 2021, Horst's Bucks became NBA champions.

References

1983 births
Living people
American men's basketball players
Basketball players from Michigan
College men's basketball players in the United States
Milwaukee Bucks executives
People from Sanilac County, Michigan
Rochester University alumni